The following is a list of Live Rescue episodes

Series overview

Episodes

Season 1 (2019)

Season 2 (2019–20)

Season 3 (2020–21)

References

Lists of American non-fiction television series episodes
Lists of reality television series episodes